Yana Viktorovna Uskova (born 28 September 1985) is a former Russian handball player, playing on the Russian women's national handball team. She won the gold medal with the Russian team in the 2007 World Women's Handball Championship and was also voted into the championship's All-Star Team.

References

Russian female handball players
Handball players at the 2008 Summer Olympics
Olympic handball players of Russia
Olympic silver medalists for Russia
1985 births
Living people
People from Maykop
Olympic medalists in handball
Medalists at the 2008 Summer Olympics
Sportspeople from Adygea